Shadwell was a railway station in the parish of St. George in the East, London, that was opened by the Commercial Railway (later the London and Blackwall Railway). It was situated 50 yards to the east of the current Shadwell DLR station on the Docklands Light Railway, with the former station entrance on Sutton Street (Shadwell DLR's entrance is on Watney Street).

Shadwell opened in October 1840, three months after the opening of the rest of the Commercial Railway, which rebranded as the LBR in 1841. It was eventually incorporated into the London, Tilbury and Southend Railway (LTSR) and was rebuilt in 1895 when the railway was widened to four tracks; Shadwell only served the slow lines on the south side.

In 1900, the station was renamed Shadwell & St. George's East, possibly to distinguish it from the East London Railway (ELR) station of the same name.

Apart from a wartime closure between 1916 and 1919, Shadwell & St. George's East remained open until July 1941, when dwindling passenger numbers forced its then owner, the London and North Eastern Railway, to close both it and Leman Street station. Some remains of the station can still be seen today: the westbound platform has partially survived although it is somewhat dilapidated, and the red brick station entrance on Sutton Street still survives.

The Docklands Light Railway Shadwell station has been built partly on the site of the station.

References

 

}}

Disused railway stations in the London Borough of Tower Hamlets
Railway stations in Great Britain opened in 1840
Railway stations in Great Britain closed in 1916
Railway stations in Great Britain opened in 1919
Railway stations in Great Britain closed in 1941
Former London and Blackwall Railway stations